Vernon Stanley Hoium (born March 7, 1930) is an American politician in the state of Minnesota. He served in the Minnesota State Senate from 1963 to 1966. He is a lawyer.

References

1930 births
Living people
People from Columbia Heights, Minnesota
Lawyers from Minneapolis
Politicians from Minneapolis
University of Minnesota Law School alumni
Minnesota state senators